Maksim "Max" Vangeli (born 4 August 1985) is a Moldovan DJ and record producer based in San Francisco, United States.

Vangeli is best known for his house music productions and collaboration with Swedish DJ and record producer Antoine Josefsson, better known as AN21. The duo is popularly known as AN21 and Max Vangeli.

Biography
Max Vangeli was born on 4 August 1985, and raised in Moldova until in his teens when he moved to the United States. On regular trips back to Europe he was introduced to house music. He began his career as a DJ at the University of California in Santa Barbara. To reach a larger audience and pursue his musical ambitions, he eventually relocated to San Francisco.

Musical career

2008–2011: Career beginnings and early success

In 2008, Max Vangeli released his debut EP entitled Crazed EP via Rising Trax. In 2009, Vangeli released the singles, "Aqua Kai," "Exit", "Fender Bender," and "Your Love", which featured Digital Lab and Simone Denny. On 9 December, Max Vangeli made his debut on Steve Angello's record label, Size Records, alongside Swedish DJ, AN21 with the single, "Gama".

In 2010, Max Vangeli released his second collaboration with AN21 entitled "Swedish Beauty", via Refune Music. The song was named an "Essential New Tune" by Pete Tong of BBC Radio 1. Soon after, Max Vangeli and AN21 collaborated again for the release of their remix of Ellie Goulding's single, "Starry Eyed." The remix was released as a free download on 23 March. On 14 June, Max Vangeli released the single, "Look Into Your Heart", via the record label, U-BOOT. Two days later, on 16 June, Vangeli released his collaboration with Max C entitled, "Let It Rain", via PBR Recordings. Alongside Steve Angello and AN21, Vangeli remixed "The Island" for the Australian band Pendulum. The record was dubbed the 'hottest track in the world' on the radio program of Zane Lowe for BBC Radio 1, and reached Number 3 in the global sales Beatport chart, once released in November. During the year, Vangeli performed at international festivals including Creamfields in the UK and Mysteryland in Amsterdam; as well as mega-clubs such as Cocoon in Frankfurt, Avalon in Los Angeles and Mansion in Miami, Florida. Later that year, he was named as one of the DJ Mag’s "Top 5 DJs to watch in 2011".

In 2011, Max Vangeli was named as MTV's, "destined to be one of the most promising artists of the year 2011 ". On 15 February, Vangeli and AN21's remix of "Starry Eyed" was officially released and featured on the official remix EP of the following track. Throughout the year, Vangeli focused on live endeavours and marked frequent slots at Pacha Ibiza for the Masquerade Motel alongside Swedish supergroup Swedish House Mafia, as well as spots at Sensation White.

2012–2015: Career with AN21, Size Records and other projects

In 2012, Max Vangeli released his debut studio album with AN21, entitled, "People Of the Night," which was released on the Size Records label. The album featured a series of collaborations, those of which included the DJs: Congorock, Kim Fai, Michael Woods, Moguai, Steve Angello and Tiësto; and the vocalists: Bnann, Example, Julie McKnight, Rudy and Sadapa. The album was also home to the singles: "H8RS," (with Steve Angello), "Bombs Over Capitals," featuring Julie McKnight, "Lost," with Congorock, "Glow," featuring Bnann and the album's title track with Tiësto. Most of Vangeli's tours that year were with his partner AN21 and Steve Angello. In 2013, Max Vangeli launched a weekly podcast and radio show called, "CODE RADIO", which is syndicated in 35 countries.

In 2014, Vangeli collaborated with his childhood friend Danny Ray to release the single "Grim" on Size Records. Later on, Vangeli released a vocal record called, "Last Night Changed It All," also through Size Records on 31 March. it charted in the Top 25 of the iTunes dance chart. On 9 July, Vangeli released his second collaborative effort with Danny Ray titled, "Bang the Drums," via Size Records as a free download. On 27 October, Vangeli released his track with Adrien Mezsi called, "DNCE," exclusively via Spotify. The track was released by Size Records. On 1 December, Vangeli and AN21 collaborated once again for the release of the vocal single, "Tonight," via Size Records. Corey James and Will K released a remix of the following track as a free download via Size Records later on.

In January 2015, Max Vangeli announced on Facebook that he planned to start his own music label. He then released the vocal single, "You And Me," via Size Records on 25 January. Soon after, Max Vangeli released the single, "Skin," with Flatdisk via Sosumi Records, being the first release by Vangeli to not be with Size Records since 2012. On 29 October, Vangeli released the song, "Say My Name," as a free download exclusively through his SoundCloud account.

2016–present: New music and NoFace Records

In January 2016, Max Vangeli collaborated with Armada Music and launched his record label, NoFace Records. On 11 January, he released the label's first single, "Shine," featuring Frances Marvel and Kacie Marie. On 22 February, Max Vangeli released NoFace Records' second track, "Blow This Club," in collaboration with Flatdisk. On 2 May, Vangeli released his third single with NoFace Records titled, "Stay Out," featuring Connor Foley. On 2 June, Max Vangeli released the single, "Get High" as a free download via his record label, NoFace Records. He then released the single, "Feel the Music" with De KiBo on 1 August, also via NoFace Records. On 19 September, Vangeli released the single, "Why Do I," featuring Mackenzie Thoms, via NoFace Records.

NoFace Records

In January 2016, Max Vangeli collaborated with Armada Music and launched his record label NoFace Records.

On September 9, 2019, Vangeli rebooted his label "NoFace Records" and released his new single Golden Rings, featuring Sergio Echenique & Snenie.

On July 24, 2019, Vangeli signed Mawsua to NoFace Records and "Rapt", was released in September 20, 2019 through the label. The label then released a promotional video welcoming the new artist.

Singles

Discography

Singles

Remixes and mashups

With AN21

As a solo artist

Mashups

References

External links
Official website

Moldovan DJs
1985 births
Living people
American people of Moldovan descent